DMST can refer to :

 The Drypool and Marfleet Steam Tramways, 19th century steam tram company in Kingston upon Hull, UK
 Domestic Minor Sex Trafficking, a form of child prostitution
 The Department of Military Science & Tactics, a department at various Philippines educational institutes including
 University of the Philippines
 University of Santo Tomas, 
 Mapua Institute of Technology Reserve Officers' Training Corps
 University of the Philippines Diliman
 Do Make Say Think, Canadian music band